The canton of Samer is a former canton situated in the department of the Pas-de-Calais and in the Nord-Pas-de-Calais region of northern France. It was disbanded following the French canton reorganisation which came into effect in March 2015. It had a total of 27,775 inhabitants (2012).

Geography 
The canton is organised around Samer in the arrondissement of Boulogne-sur-Mer. The altitude varies from 2m (Saint-Léonard) to 199m (Samer) for an average altitude of 53m.

The canton comprised 18 communes:

Carly
Condette
Dannes
Doudeauville
Halinghen
Hesdigneul-lès-Boulogne
Hesdin-l'Abbé
Isques
Lacres
Nesles
Neufchâtel-Hardelot
Questrecques
Saint-Étienne-au-Mont
Saint-Léonard
Samer
Tingry
Verlincthun
Wierre-au-Bois

Population

See also 
Cantons of Pas-de-Calais 
Communes of Pas-de-Calais 
Arrondissements of the Pas-de-Calais department

References

Samer
2015 disestablishments in France
States and territories disestablished in 2015